The Wisconsin Badgers are the athletic teams representing the University of Wisconsin–Madison (University of Wisconsin). They compete as a member of the National Collegiate Athletic Association (NCAA) Division I level (Football Bowl Subdivision (FBS) sub-level), primarily competing in the Big Ten Conference for all sports since the 1896–97 season. The women's ice hockey team competes in the Western Collegiate Hockey Association (WCHA), while the men's crew team compete in the Eastern Association of Rowing Colleges (EARC).

The athletic director is Chris McIntosh, former professional football player and lineman for the Wisconsin Badger football team. The Badgers team colors are cardinal and white, and the team mascot is named "Buckingham U. Badger," known as "Bucky Badger." The Badgers have several major on-campus facilities, including Camp Randall Stadium, the UW Field House, and the Kohl Center.

Team name origin

Wisconsin was dubbed the "Badger State" because of the  lead miners who first settled there in the 1820s and 1830s. Without shelter in the winter, they had to "live like badgers" in tunnels burrowed into hillsides.
The badger mascot was adopted by the University of Wisconsin in 1889.

His name, "Buckingham U. Badger", a.k.a. "Bucky Badger," was chosen in a contest in 1949. The emblem, a scowling, strutting badger wearing a cardinal-and-white striped sweater, was designed by Art Evans in 1940 and updated in 2003. A live badger from Eau Claire was used at the first few football games that year, but proved to be too fierce to be controlled and was retired to the nearby Henry Vilas Zoo. For a time, the school replaced the live badger with a live raccoon named "Regdab" ("badger" backwards).

In 2006, Bucky Badger became a charter member of the Mascot Hall of Fame's College Division. Bucky Badger has a tradition of doing the amount of pushups that the football team has every time they score.

Sports sponsored 

Wisconsin is the only Big Ten school and one of only four Power 5 schools that do not sponsor baseball, the other three being Colorado, Iowa State, and Syracuse.  Wisconsin is also the only Big Ten school with a varsity men's rowing program.  Badger men's rowing has won 9 national championships, making it Wisconsin's most successful athletics program.

Men's basketball 

Wisconsin has made it to the NCAA Final Four four times in its history — back-to-back trips in 2015 and 2014, in 2000, and in 1941, when it won the national championship. The Badgers participated in the NCAA tournament for 19 consecutive seasons (1999–2017). Wisconsin tied for first place in the Big Ten in the 2001–02 season, along with Indiana, Illinois, and Ohio State. In 2002–03 the Badgers won the Big Ten outright, but then lost in the quarterfinals of the Big Ten tournament to Ohio State. In the NCAA Tournament, Wisconsin lost to Kentucky in the Sweet 16. In 2003–04, Wisconsin finished second in the Big Ten. The team went on to win the program's first Big Ten tournament title. However, the Badgers lost to 3rd-seeded Pittsburgh in the second round of the NCAA Tournament. In the 2004–05 season Wisconsin finished third in the Big Ten. In the 2005 NCAA Tournament, Wisconsin advanced to the Elite Eight by defeating 11th-seeded Northern Iowa, 14th-seeded Bucknell, and 10th-seeded North Carolina State. In 2005–06 the Badgers lost to Indiana in the Big Ten tournament quarterfinals, and to Arizona in the first round of the NCAA Tournament. The highlight of the season was a win over intrastate rival Marquette.

In the 2006–07 season the Badgers had victories at Marquette and at home against 2nd ranked Pittsburgh. Its lone non-conference loss was against Missouri State. On February 19, 2007, they earned their first No. 1 ranking in school history with a 26–2 record, but were defeated the next day by the unranked Michigan State Spartans. Entering the Big 10 Tournament as the second seed, their first game was against Michigan State, who the Badgers defeated 70–57. In the next round against Illinois, the Badgers won 53–41 and advanced to the final to face No. 1-ranked Ohio State. The Buckeyes defeated the Badgers 66–49. In the NCAA Tournament Wisconsin received a Number 2 seed in the Midwest bracket. The Badgers defeated Texas A&M Corpus-Christi. The second round of the tournament proved fatal for the Badgers, who lost to UNLV.

Dick Bennett is largely credited with beginning the turnaround of the program. During his six-year tenure at Wisconsin (1995–2000), the Badgers achieved a 91–68 record and had two 20-win seasons. Only twice previously had the Badgers won at least 20 games in a season, the most recent being the 1940–41 championship season. Coach Bo Ryan has been in charge since the 2001–02 season and has led the Badgers to the NCAA Tournament every year. During the 2006–07 season, he not only achieved his 500th win as a college coach but the Badgers were also ranked Number 1 in the AP Top for the first time in program history. On December 12, 2009, Ryan earned his 200th win with the Badgers (against 75 losses), defeating in-state rival Marquette. During the 2014–2015 season, the Badgers reached the National Championship game, but lost to Mike Krzyzewski's Duke squad.

Badgers currently in the NBA include Sam Dekker, Frank Kaminsky, Devin Harris, Greg Stiemsma and Jon Leuer.

Football 

Wisconsin's football program has been among the most successful in the Big Ten since the early 1990s, when Barry Alvarez was hired as head coach. Under Alvarez, the Badgers won three Big Ten Championships and three Rose Bowls. In the 2005 season, Alvarez's last year as coach, the Badgers defeated the Auburn Tigers 24-10, in the Capital One Bowl. In 2006, Bret Bielema took over as head coach, posting a 12–1 record and defeating Arkansas 17-14, in the Capital One Bowl. On December 5, 2012, Bielema announced his departure for Arkansas, stating,  "I just felt it was time for me to try and spread my wings and fly a little bit further." Bielema was Alvarez's handpicked successor, and he coached the Badgers in their return to the Rose Bowl. The Badgers are 16–14 in bowl games, and have made 14 bowl appearance in the past 15 seasons, including a school record seven straight appearances. The Badger football program has had two Heisman Trophy winners: fullback Alan Ameche in 1954, and running back Ron Dayne in 1999. They came close in the 2011–2012 season, with their running back Montee Ball, who was a finalist but lost to Robert Griffin III (RG3). Running back Melvin Gordon was runner-up in 2014.Under Paul Chryst they have won 4 straight bowl games and 2 NY6 bowl wins in the Cotton and Orange bowls and never winning less than 8 games in a season in his 4 years.

The Wisconsin Badgers football team plays its home games at Camp Randall Stadium. Built in 1917, Camp Randall is the fourth-oldest college football stadium in the country and has a capacity of 80,321. The student section at Camp Randall is considered by many to be one of the best in all of college football.  Among the stadium traditions is a well-known student celebration to the House of Pain song "Jump Around," occurring at the end of the third quarter of every home game. The students also sing songs in unison, including "Sweet Caroline" and "(Build Me Up) Buttercup". The University of Wisconsin Marching Band performs its "Fifth Quarter" after every game.

Ice hockey 

The Badger men won their sixth national championship in 2006, at the Bradley Center in Milwaukee, with a 2–1 victory over Boston College. The men's team had previously won the national championship in 1973, 1977, 1981, 1983, and 1990.

The Badger women won their first title in 2006, at Mariucci Arena in Minneapolis, with a 3–0 victory over the defending champion Minnesota Golden Gophers. This was the first women's hockey national championship for Wisconsin and the first time that the NCAA Women's National Championship trophy left the state of Minnesota. (Minnesota-Duluth won the trophy in 2001, 2002, and 2003; Minnesota won it in 2004 and 2005.) The victory did, however, continue the Western Collegiate Hockey Association's dominance of the women's crown. On March 18, 2007, the Badger women captured the back-to-back national championship with a 4–1 win over Minnesota-Duluth at Herb Brooks Arena, in Lake Placid, New York. The Badgers returned to the national championship game in 2008, but suffered a 4–0 loss at the hands of Minnesota-Duluth. In 2009, the Badgers became the first team in NCAA history to reach the title game in four consecutive seasons, winning their third national championship with a 5–0 victory over Mercyhurst. The Badgers went on to win their fourth and most recent national championship in 2011, defeating Boston University 4-1 at Tullio Arena in Erie, Pennsylvania.

Mike Eaves was the head coach of the men's hockey team until March 2016, while Mark Johnson coaches the women's hockey team. Both coaches were teammates on the Badgers' 1977 NCAA title team.  Former Denver Pioneers head coach George Gwozdecky, the only other person besides Eaves and Johnson to win ice hockey national championships as both a player and head coach, was also a member of Wisconsin's 1977 national championship team.

The men's team plays their home games at the Kohl Center in Madison. The women's team plays their home games at LaBahn Arena.  Both teams use the LaBahn Arena as a practice facility.

Softball

The Badgers softball team began play in 1996. The team has made seven NCAA Tournament appearances in 2001, 2002, 2005, 2013, 2014, 2017, and 2018. The current head coach is Yvette Healy.

Wrestling 
The University of Wisconsin wrestling team was established in 1911. Through the 2018–19 season, the UW Badger wrestling team has had 18 NCAA champions, 70 Big Ten champions, 112 All-Americans, and 4 Olympians. Home dual meets and tournaments take place at the Wisconsin Fieldhouse. Barry Davis served as head coach of the program for 25 years until his retirement in 2018. Former South Dakota State University head coach Chris Bono, took over as Wisconsin's head coach at the start of the 2018–19 season.

Championships

NCAA team championships
Wisconsin has won 32 NCAA national championships:

Men's (22)
Basketball (1): 1941 
Boxing (8): 1939 (unofficial), 1942 (unofficial), 1943 (unofficial), 1947 (unofficial), 1948, 1952, 1954, 1956
Cross country (5): 1982, 1985, 1988, 2005, 2011
Ice hockey (6): 1973, 1977, 1981, 1983, 1990, 2006
Indoor track & field (1): 2007
Soccer (1): 1995
Women's (10)
Cross country (2): 1984, 1985
Ice hockey (7): 2006, 2007, 2009, 2011, 2019, 2021, 2023
Volleyball (1): 2021
See also: 
List of NCAA schools with the most NCAA Division I championships
Big Ten Conference NCAA national team championships

Other national team championships
Below are 21 national team titles that were not bestowed by the NCAA: 
 
Men's (13)
Basketball (3): 1912, 1914, 1916 (retroactive Helms and Premo-Porretta selections)
Football (1):  1942 (Helms; unclaimed)
Rowing (9): 1951, 1959, 1966, 1973, 1974, 1975, 1986†, 1990, 2008
Women's (8)
Badminton (1): 1983
Rowing (2): 1975, 1986
Lightweight rowing (5): 2004, 2005, 2006, 2008, 2009

† All men's and women's rowing titles above included winning the eights. The men's 1986 title was not an IRA championship but rather a now-defunct finals-only meet that included three rowing squads with a history of snubbing the IRAs. In 1990, Wisconsin's men's titles included both this event and the IRA eights championship.

See also: 
List of Big Ten Conference national championships 
List of NCAA schools with the most Division I national championships

Athletes of the Year

Trademark dispute
The University of Wisconsin has been involved in disputes with a number of high schools, including Westside High School in Omaha, Nebraska, and schools in Iowa, New Jersey, North Carolina, Ohio, Texas, and West Virginia, as well as with D-II Washburn University in Topeka, Kansas. The issue involved the use of the Badgers' athletic logo, the "motion W". As a result of the litigation, the high schools involved were required to change their logos.

References

External links

 
 University of Wisconsin–Madison Athletic Department Collection